"Memoria" is a song recorded by South Korean girl group GFriend. It was released by King Records on October 10, 2018, as the group's second Japanese single.

Composition 
The song was described by Billboard's Tamar Herman, as an "effervescent dance track", that "returns [GFriend] to the sweet synth-pop style they favored on early releases". Adding that "the track leads with plinking synths and gentle instrumentals before building into a majestic, tempo-shifting choral climax introduced by bright strings and graceful harmonies as the six women let their vocals soar".

Release 
The single was released in three editions: Regular, Limited Type A and Limited Type B. It was also released as a digital EP.

Commercial performance 
The single debuted at number 5 on the Oricon Singles Chart in its first day and peaked at number 2 in its third day with 1,704 copies sold.

Memoria debuted at number 6 on the Oricon Singles chart in its first week, with 16,602 physical copies sold. The song also debuted at number 13 on Billboard Japan Hot 100, placing at number 5 on Top Singles Sales, for 16,880 estimated sales.

The single was 31st best-selling single for October 2018 with 17,593 copies sold.

Music video 
A music video for "Memoria" was released on September 19, 2018. The video features the group as they dream away their days, before waking up in a slightly changed world full of glitter, art, angels, and more before they all come together atop of a roof. For the choreography scenes, the members don a variety of tartan-patterned dresses as they perform the sweeping, ballet-inspired routine.

Track listing

Charts

References 

2018 singles
2018 songs
GFriend songs
Hybe Corporation singles